Frank Graves may refer to:

 Frank Graves (baseball) (1860–1916), baseball catcher and manager
 Frank Graves (pollster), Canadian applied social researcher
 Frank Pierrepont Graves (1869–1956), Commissioner of the New York State Education Department, 1921–1940
 Frank X. Graves Jr. (1923–1990), American Democratic Party politician, mayor of Paterson, New Jersey